Mark E. Smith (born July 14, 1971) is an American professional racing driver with experience in sprint car and stock car racing. He last competed in the United Sprint Car Series and part-time in the NASCAR Gander RV & Outdoors Truck Series, driving the No. 42 Chevrolet Silverado for Niece Motorsports.

Racing career

Sprint car career
Smith's early career progressed from go-kart racing to Super Sportsman racing to sprint car racing, including 360 and 410 sprint cars, as well as competing in the World of Outlaws. He won the United Sprint Car Series Winter Heat championship in 2019, and has estimated his number of open-wheel victories at 200. In winter 2020, Smith raced in the USCS Thunder Tour, scoring three wins in the first two months of the year.

Stock car career
On July 20, 2019, it was announced that Smith was scheduled to make his NASCAR Gander Outdoors Truck Series debut at the 2019 Eldora Dirt Derby in a partnership between Jordan Anderson Racing and Niece Motorsports.

A year later, he rejoined Niece in their No. 42 entry to drive the Daytona road course race.

Business career
Mach 1 Chassis is owned by Smith, and was a partner in his NASCAR Truck Series debut.

Personal life
Smith is married with children.

Motorsports career results

NASCAR
(key) (Bold – Pole position awarded by qualifying time. Italics – Pole position earned by points standings or practice time. * – Most laps led.)

Gander RV & Outdoors Truck Series

 Season still in progress
 Ineligible for series points

References

External links
 

Living people
1971 births
People from Sunbury, Pennsylvania
Racing drivers from Pennsylvania
NASCAR drivers
Businesspeople from Pennsylvania